Heezen Glacier is a glacier flowing northeast from the eastern portion of the Wegener Range and entering Violante Inlet east of Mount Reynolds, on the Black Coast of Palmer Land, Antarctica. It was mapped by the United States Geological Survey from aerial photographs taken by the U.S. Navy, 1966–69. In association with the names of oceanographers grouped in this area, it was named by the UK Antarctic Place-Names Committee in 1977 after Bruce C. Heezen, an American marine geologist and oceanographer who was Professor of Geology at Columbia University's Lamont–Doherty Geological Observatory, 1964–77.

References

Glaciers of Palmer Land